Channing Durward Phillips (born March 9, 1958) is an attorney who served as the acting United States Attorney for the District of Columbia from March to November 2021. He previously served in the position from October 2015 to September 2017, under President Barack Obama.

Early life and education
Born and raised in Washington, D.C., Phillips earned a Bachelor of Arts degree from the University of Virginia in 1980 and a Juris Doctor from the Howard University School of Law in 1986.

Career 
In 1990, Phillips became a trial attorney at the United States Department of Justice Criminal Division in the Organized Crime & Racketeering Section. In 1994, he moved to the United States Attorney's Office in D.C. In 2010, he returned to the Justice Department to serve in the Office of the Attorney General.

In 2015, after Ronald Machen's resignation as U.S. Attorney, Delegate Eleanor Holmes Norton recommended Phillips for the position. Phillips was nominated by President Obama to be the next U.S. Attorney on October 8, 2015, and designated acting U.S. Attorney on October 19, 2015. In December 2015, Phillips announced the closure of a long-running and controversial investigation into former Mayor Vincent C. Gray, who was not charged.

During the 2017 dismissal of U.S. attorneys, Phillips was not asked to resign because he had not yet been confirmed and remained acting U.S. Attorney. On June 12, 2017, Donald Trump nominated Jessie Liu to serve as U.S. attorney. She became his successor after the United States Senate confirmed her nomination in September 2017.

On March 3, 2021, Phillips once again became acting U.S. attorney after being appointed by President Joe Biden. His service terminated once his successor, Matthew M. Graves was sworn in.

Personal life 
Phillips is the son of Channing E. Phillips, a minister and civil rights activist who became the first African-American to have his name placed in nomination for President of the United States by a major political party in 1968.

References

1958 births
Living people
African-American lawyers
Howard University School of Law alumni
United States Attorneys for the District of Columbia
University of Virginia alumni
21st-century African-American people
20th-century African-American people